Melchor Yap (6 January 1940 – 4 March 1990) was a Filipino sports shooter. He competed in the skeet event at the 1972 Summer Olympics.

References

External links
 

1940 births
1990 deaths
Filipino male sport shooters
Olympic shooters of the Philippines
Shooters at the 1972 Summer Olympics